NGC 49 is a lenticular galaxy in the Andromeda constellation. The galaxy was discovered by the American astronomer Lewis A. Swift on September 7, 1885.

References

External links
 

0049
Andromeda (constellation)
+08-01-033
00952
00136
18850907
Lenticular galaxies